The OpenDataPlane (ODP) is an open-source project which defines application programming interfaces (APIs) for portable high performance networking data plane applications. ODP API design enables various implementation strategies without exposing the application to implementation details. This allows the same application (source code or binary) to run efficiently on various hardware platforms with different levels of HW acceleration. For example, the same application source code may be re-compiled to run on a standard server system or a specialized networking System on a Chip (SoC) device.

Networking data plane refers software and hardware that forwards packets/frames from one interface to another, and usually performs various operations (check errors, add/remove/modify protocol headers, etc) on packet data. Commonly, data plane software utilizes hardware acceleration (e.g. protocol checksum calculation) to reach high packet and bit rates. Networking control plane and management plane refer to softwares that control and monitor data plane software and hardware operation.

History
On October 29, 2013 Linaro announced that it was collaborating with members of the Linaro Networking interest Group to develop and host an open standard application programming interface for data plane applications. Initially defined by members of the Linaro Networking Group, this project is open to contributions from all individuals and companies who share an interest in promoting a standard set of APIs to be used across the full range of network processor architectures available.

Technology Overview
 ODP consists of an API specification and a set of reference implementations that realize these APIs on different platforms. Implementations range from pure software to those that deeply exploit the various hardware acceleration and offload features found on modern networking System-on-Chip (SoC) processors.

ODP's goal is to allow implementers of the API great flexibility to exploit and optimize the implementation. This is intended to enable easy platform portability such that an application written to the API can pick up performance gains without needing significant platform knowledge when ported.

ODP is currently being used to develop reference platform implementations of Open Platform for NFV (OPNFV)  and is being promoted   by companies as part of their data plane support initiatives.

Products were announced by companies such as Kalray with many acronyms. The OpenDataPlane run to completion execution models and framework are also being used by FastPath applications to leverage OpenFastPath functionality. DPDK is supported in the OpenFastPath release through the ODP-DPDK layer. The intent of OpenFastPath is to enable accelerated routing/forwarding for IPv4 and IPv6, tunneling and termination for a variety of protocols.

Implementations
There is a Linux based reference software implementation of the ODP API, intended to be a functional model to establish the API behavior. In conjunction with a validation suite, this gives a base for accelerated implementations to extend.
Current ODP implementations exist for several processors, with varying degrees of hardware offload:

Current ODP Implementations

Releases
The following lists the different OpenDatePlane releases:

Ecosystem
The following organizations currently sponsor the development of ODP.
ARM
Broadcom
Cavium
Cisco
ENEA AB
Ericsson
HiSilicon
Linaro
MontaVista
Nokia
NXP
Texas Instruments
Wind - formerly Wind River Systems
ZTE

Projects
The following open source projects use ODP API as the abstraction layer towards data plane hardware.
OpenEventMachine data plane application framework
OpenFastPath TCP/IP stack

References

Application programming interfaces
Free software